The Reno-Sparks Convention Center is a convention center in the western United States, located in Reno, Nevada. Opened  in 1965 as Centennial Coliseum, it hosted the Big Sky Conference basketball tournament  and also hosts boxing matches. In 2021 the convention center will host the Legion Sports Fest, the largest fitness and bodybuilding event in the West. 

Facilities

In addition, the Mt. Rose Ballroom, a  column-free space, can be divided into seven meeting rooms. A total of 53 meeting rooms, of capacities ranging from fifty to over three thousand, are available within the complex.

References

1965 establishments in Nevada
Basketball venues in Nevada
Boxing venues in Nevada
College basketball venues in the United States
Indoor arenas in Nevada
Sports venues in Reno, Nevada